The Southeastern Intercollegiate Sailing Association (SEISA) is one of the seven conferences within the Inter-Collegiate Sailing Association, the governing body in the sport of sailing for collegiate competition in the United States.

Members

References

External links
 Official website

ICSA conferences